Gonny Buurmeester (born 14 October 1970), known professionally as Maxine, is a Dutch singer. She is known for representing the Netherlands in the Eurovision Song Contest 1996, together with Franklin Brown.

Career 
Born in 1970, Maxine grew up in Rotterdam and later moved to Breda. At the age of fifteen, she started taking singing lessons in Antwerp, Belgium. Her first single was a cover of the song "A Love So Beautiful" by Roy Orbison.

In 1996, she entered the Nationaal Songfestival – the Dutch national selection for the Eurovision Song Contest – together with Franklin Brown. Their entry "De eerste keer" went on to win the competition, giving them the right to represent the Netherlands in the Eurovision Song Contest 1996 held in Oslo, Norway. They finished in seventh place with 78 points.

After the contest, Maxine pursued a solo career. In 2000, she was a contestant in Big Brother VIPs.

Discography

Singles 
 "De eerste keer" (1996) – with Franklin Brown
 "Als je weet wat je wilt" (1996)
 "Nooit meer alleen" (1997)
 "Waanzin" (1997)
 "African Dream" (1999)
 "Free (Let It Be)" (2003) – with Stuart
 "Fuel to Fire" (2003) – with Stuart
 "Steeds weer" (2007) – with Franklin Brown
 "Balsem voor het hart" (2012) – with Franklin Brown

References 

1970 births
Living people
Musicians from Rotterdam
Nationaal Songfestival contestants
Eurovision Song Contest entrants for the Netherlands
Eurovision Song Contest entrants of 1996
20th-century Dutch women singers
21st-century Dutch women singers
21st-century Dutch singers